State Route 229 (SR 229), also known as R W Moore Memorial Rt Highway, is a very short  long north-south state highway in Hickman County, Tennessee. It is the only access road in and out of Turney Center Industrial Complex, a state prison. SR 229 is a very curvy and rural two-lane highway for its entire length, and it parallels the Duck River for the majority of its length.

Some maps, such as Google Maps, show SR 229 continuing north along Only Road and Dyer Road to pass through the community of Only, even though this is not recognized by TDOT as part of SR 229 and is actually a former alignment of SR 50.

Major intersections

References

229
Transportation in Hickman County, Tennessee